This is a list of world records progression in women's weightlifting from 1998 and 2018. These records are maintained in each weight class for the snatch lift, clean and jerk lift, and the total for both lifts.

The International Weightlifting Federation restructured its weight classes in 2018, nullifying earlier records.

48 kg

Snatch

Clean & Jerk

Total

53 kg

Snatch

Clean & Jerk

Total

58 kg

Snatch

Clean & Jerk

Total

63 kg

Snatch

Clean & Jerk

Total

69 kg

Snatch

Clean & Jerk

Total

75 kg

Snatch

Clean & Jerk

Total

90 kg

Snatch

Clean & Jerk

Total

+90 kg

Snatch

Clean & Jerk

Total

Notes
  Not a world record at the time of the competition, became a world record when IWF introduced a new weight category on 1 January 2017.
  Rescinded for anti-doping violations.
  Hripsime Khurshudyan's records from 25 September 2010 was rescinded in 2020 following disqualification for banned drug use; which could make Derya Açıkgöz and Viktoriya Shaimardanova the world record holders. By that time, however, the IWF changed the weight classes and erased all previous records.

See also
 World record progression women's weightlifting
 World record progression men's weightlifting
 World record progression men's weightlifting (1998–2018)

References

External links
IWF official website
World Record progressions

Women's weightlifting
Olympic weightlifting records